Enoch James West (31 March 1886 – September 1965), nicknamed Knocker, was an English footballer who played as a centre forward for Nottingham Forest and  Manchester United before being banned for match fixing.

West was born in Hucknall Torkard in Nottinghamshire. He started his career for Sheffield United but failed to break into the first team.

Club career

Nottingham Forest
He transferred in 1905 for a fee of £5 to Nottingham Forest and made his debut on 16 September 1905 in the 3–2 victory at home to Bury.

West scored 14 league goals in his first season (1905/06) as Forest were relegated to the Second Division on goal average. 
In his second season (1906/07) Forest finished top of the Second Division partly due to West's 14 league goals.

He top scored in 1907/08 (29 league goals) and 1908/09 (22 league goals) outscoring Grenville Morris.

In the 1907/08 season he got 4 First Division hat-tricks including all 4 goals in the game against Sunderland on 9 November 1907. The other hat-tricks were against Chelsea, Blackburn Rovers and Everton.

On 13 March 1909 West became the first ever player to be sent off for Nottingham Forest while playing against Derby County in the FA Cup 4th Round by referee T. Kirkham.

He scored a hat-trick against Leicester Fosse on 21 April 1909 in Forest's record league win, a 12–0 victory (Alf Spouncer and Hooper also scored 3 while Grenville Morris scored 2).

West's last game for Nottingham Forest was on 30 April 1910 away to Bristol City.

Manchester United
In 1910, he transferred to Manchester United. He helped the club win the 1911 league medal. He scored 80 goals in his Manchester United career, his most successful season being the 1911-12 season when he scored a total of 23 goals; 17 in the league and six in the FA Cup, although United failed to win either of these competitions.

In 1915, he was banned for life by the Football Association, along with three other United players and four Liverpool players after being found guilty of match fixing. West protested his innocence, but his ban was not lifted until 1945. His suspension, which lasted 30 years, was the longest in Football League history. As he was 59 by the time his ban was lifted, he was never involved in football again.

West died in 1965, at the age of 79.

Career statistics

See also
1915 British football betting scandal

Notes and references 

1886 births
1965 deaths
People from Hucknall
Footballers from Nottinghamshire
English footballers
English Football League players
First Division/Premier League top scorers
Sheffield United F.C. players
Nottingham Forest F.C. players
Manchester United F.C. players
English Football League representative players
Association football forwards
Sportspeople involved in betting scandals